Constance Frederica “Eka” Gordon-Cumming (26 May 1837 – 4 September 1924) was a noted Scottish travel writer and painter. Born in a wealthy family, she travelled around the world and painted described scenes and life as she saw them. She was a friend and influencer of the travel writers and artists  Marianne North and Isabella Bird.

Biography 
Eka's grandfather Sir Alexander Cumming inherited the wealth of his wife and the name and arms of Gordon of Gordonstoun in 1804 and used the hyphenated double surname which was not consistently used by family members. She was born on 26 May 1837 at Altyre, near Forres in Scotland, the 12th child of a wealthy family. Her parents were Sir William Gordon Gordon-Cumming, 2nd Baronet, and Eliza Maria Gordon-Cumming, granddaughter of the Duke of Argyll. Eka was the aunt of Sir William Gordon-Cumming, 4th Baronet. Little is known about her early education but she would have had private home tutors. Her mother was interested in geology and was familiar with the works of Robert Murchison. A Swiss  maid,  Cherie, taught her French and after the death of her mother in 1848, she went to live with an aunt in Northumberland. She went to Hermitage Lodge at Fulham leaving it in 1853. Many of her family members were travellers, an uncle Charles Cumming-Bruce married the grand-daughter of the Nile explorer James Bruce of Kinnaird. Her brother Alexander had been Canada while another, Roualeyn had been Africa where he had been famous as a big-game hunter. Another brother John was a planter in Ceylon while William was a soldier in India. William wrote about his hunting in "Wild Men and Wild Beasts" (1871) dedicated to Col. Walter Campbell ("The Old Forest Ranger"). Her travelling phase began around 1866 when she was in Loch Ness where her terminally ill brother Roualeyn was being nursed by another sister. In 1868 she went on a painting tour with her half-brother Frederick to the Western Islands. She taught herself how to paint, and had help from artists visiting her home, including one of Queen Victoria's favorite painters, Sir Edwin Landseer. She also took an invitation from her half-sister Emilia  Sergison to visit India and after spending a year there she wrote In the Himalayas and on the Indian Plains (1884).  This was followed by, twelve  years  of  enchanting  travel  which followed would never have been dreamt of, for link by link that pleasant chain wove itself, as she described it.

Gordon-Cumming was a prolific travel writer and landscape painter who traveled the world, mostly in Asia and the Pacific. She painted over a thousand watercolors and worked with a motto to ‘never a day without at least one careful-coloured sketch’ starting her day at 5am while in India. Places she visited include Australia, New Zealand, America, China, and Japan. She arrived in Hilo, Hawaii in October 1879, and was among the first artists to paint the active volcanoes.  Her Hawaii travelogue, Fire Fountains: The Kingdom of Hawaii, was published in Edinburgh in 1883.  She had several dangerous moments but her travel ended in 1880 when the Montana that she was on ran into rocks at Holyhead. While most of the passengers took the lifeboat, she stayed on last along with the captain to save her paintings and was rescued many hours later. She returned to live at Crieff with her widowed sister Eleanor and continued to write books.

Her best known books are At Home in Fiji and A Lady's Cruise on a French Man-of-War. The latter book resulted from an invitation to join a French ship put into service for the Bishop of Samoa so that he could visit remote parts of his far-flung diocese.

Miss Gordon-Cumming received much criticism from male writers of the era, perhaps because she did not fit in the traditional Victorian role of women, as she often traveled alone and unaided. Henry Adams said her books are a collection of anecdotes without much interest. In any case, her landscape drawings and watercolors seem to be universally admired.

Gordon-Cumming visited Yosemite Valley in April 1878, after visiting Tahiti. She intended to visit for 3 days, but ended up staying 3 months. She says "I for one have wandered far enough over the wide world to know a unique glory when I am blessed by the sight of one . . ." She published her letters back home as Granite Crags in 1884. While in Yosemite Miss Gordon-Cumming also drew watercolor sketches, which she displayed in Yosemite Valley—making it the first art exhibition in Yosemite.

In 1879, while visiting Peking, China, Miss Gordon-Cumming met William Hill Murray, a Scottish missionary to China. He had invented the Numeral Type system, through which blind and illiterate Chinese learned to read and write, by assigning numbers to each of the 408 Chinese Mandarin sounds. Gordon-Cumming wrote a book (1899) about the system and supported the school for the rest of her life. She died in Scotland on 4 September 1924, and is buried near Crieff.

The Honolulu Museum of Art, the Oakland Museum of California and the Yosemite Museum are among the public collections holding works by Constance Gordon-Cumming.

Selected works

Publications 

 1876 From the Hebrides to the Himalayas; a Sketch of Eighteen Months' Wanderings in Western Isles and Eastern Highlands. (London: Sampson Low, Marston)
 1881 "The Last King of Tahiti," Contemporary Review, v.41, (London)
 1881 At Home in Fiji (Edinburgh: William Blackwood)
 1882 A Lady's Cruise in a French Man-of-War (Edinburgh: William Blackwood & Sons)
 1882 "Gordon Ningpo and the Buddhist Temples," The Century Magazine (Sept.) (online at Making of America)
 1883 Fire Fountains: The Kingdom of Hawaii (Edinburgh: William Blackwood)
 1883 In the Hebrides (Edinburgh). Cruising the Scottish Islands.
 1884 "Fijian Pottery," The Art Journal
 1884 Granite Crags Edinburgh and London: William Blackwood & Sons). Reprinted in 1886 and 1888 as Granite Crags of California, minus 2 illustrations
 1884 In the Himalayas and on the Indian Plains (London: Chatto & Windus)
 1884 "New Zealand in Blooming December," The Century Magazine (Dec.) (online at Making of America)
 1885 "The Offerings of the Dead," British Quarterly Review
 1885 Via Cornwell to Egypt (London: Chatto & Windus)
 1886 Granite crags of California (Edinburgh & London: William Blackwood & Sons)
 1886 Wanderings in China 2 v. (Edinburgh & London: William Blackwood & Sons) 
 1887 Work for the Blind in China: Showing How Blind Beggars may be transformed into useful Scripture Readers Part I (London: Gilbert & Rivington), Part II (Helensburgh, [1892])
 1889 Notes on Ceylon (London)
 1889 Notes on China and its Missions (London)
 1890 "Across the Yellow Sea," Blackwood's Magazine
 1892 Two Happy Years in Ceylon, 4d ed., 2 v. (Edinburgh & London: William Blackwood & Sons)
 1893 Two Happy Years in Ceylon, (London: Chatto & Windus)
 1895 The Blind in China (Helensburgh)
 1899 The Inventor of the Numeral-type for China, by the use of which Illiterate Chinese both Blind and Sighted can very Quickly be Taught to Read and Write Fluently (London: Downey & Co.)
 1900 Wanderings in China (Edinburgh: W. Blackwood.)
 1904 Memories. Autobiography

Footnotes

1837 births
1924 deaths
People from Moray
Scottish travel writers
British women travel writers
Scottish women painters
Volcano School painters
Landscape artists
19th-century American painters
20th-century American painters
19th-century American women artists
20th-century American women artists
Daughters of baronets